Placeholder names are words that can refer to things or people whose names do not exist, are temporarily forgotten, are not relevant to the salient point at hand, are to avoid stigmatization, are unknowable/unpredictable in the context in which they are being discussed, or are otherwise de-emphasized whenever the speaker or writer is unable to, or chooses not to, specify precisely.

Placeholder names for people are often terms referring to an average person or a predicted persona of a typical user.

Linguistic role 
These placeholders typically function grammatically as nouns and can be used for people (e.g. John Doe, Jane Doe), objects (e.g. widget), locations ("Main Street"), or places (e.g. Anytown, USA). They share a property with pronouns, because their referents must be supplied by context; but, unlike a pronoun, they may be used with no referent—the important part of the communication is not the thing nominally referred to by the placeholder, but the context in which the placeholder occurs.

In their Dictionary of American Slang (1960), Stuart Berg Flexner and Harold Wentworth use the term kadigan for placeholder words. They define "kadigan" as a synonym for thingamajig. The term may have originated with Willard R. Espy, though others, such as David Annis, also used it (or cadigans) in their writing. Its etymology is obscure—Flexner and Wentworth related it to the generic word gin for engine (as in the cotton gin). It may also relate to the Irish surname Cadigan. 

Hypernyms (words for generic categories; e.g., "flower" for tulips and roses) may also be used in this function of a placeholder, but they are not considered to be kadigans.

Examples 
Placeholder words exist in a highly informal register of the English language. In formal speech and writing, words like accessory, paraphernalia, artifact, instrument, or utensil are preferred; these words serve substantially the same function, but differ in connotation.

Most of these words can be documented in at least the 19th century. Edgar Allan Poe wrote a short story entitled "The Literary Life of Thingum Bob, Esq.", showing that particular form to be in familiar use in the United States in the 1840s. In Gilbert and Sullivan's The Mikado, W. S. Gilbert makes the Lord High Executioner sing of a "little list" which includes:

... apologetic statesmen of a compromising kind,
Such as: What d'ye call him: Thing'em-bob, and likewise: Never-mind,
and 'St: 'st: 'st: and What's-his-name, and also You-know-who:
The task of filling up the blanks I'd rather leave to you.

Some fields have their own specific placeholder terminology. For example, "widget" in economics, engineering and electronics, or "Blackacre" and "John Doe" or "Jane Doe" in law. "X-ray" was originally a placeholder name for an unexplained phenomenon.

Companies and organizations 
 "Ace" and "Acme" were popular in company names as positioning words in alphabetical directories. They were generic, laudatory of whatever products they were used to promote and appeared at the beginning of most alpha-sorted lists.  ("Acme" is a regular English word from the Ancient Greek ,  meaning summit, highest point, extremity or peak, and thus sometimes used for "best".) A well-known example of "Acme" as a placeholder name is the Acme Corporation whose products are often seen in the Wile E. Coyote and the Road Runner cartoons.
 "Mom and Pop" (in the United States) are occasional placeholders for the individual owners of a generic small family-owned business
 High Street (UK) or Main Street (US) for the business district of a small town or village, often contrasted as a commercial business entity against Threadneedle Street,  City of London in the UK or Wall Street, New York City in America.
 "Advent corporation" is a term used by lawyers to describe an as yet unnamed corporation, while legal incorporation documents are being prepared. In the case of Advent Corporation, founder Henry Kloss decided to adopt this placeholder name as the formal legal name of his new company.
 "NewCo" or "Newco" is used in a similar way in the UK for an as-yet-unnamed company.
 Fictional brands such as Morley are often used in television and cinema as placeholders to avoid unintended product placement. "Brand X" has been used in television advertisements as a generic brand representing any other brand than the one being advertised.
 "XYZ Widget Company" has long been used in business and economics textbooks as a sample company. Also used as engraving text example on items such as plaques, trophy plates, etc. Occasionally appears on customizable promotional materials including stationery templates, business cards, advertising signage, cups, backpacks, and other "swag" samples.
 "Contoso" and previously "Northwind" are used as fictional businesses in Microsoft's training materials and documentation.
 "Oceanic Airlines" is used as a fictional airline in several films, TV programmes, and comic books, typically when it is involved in a disaster or another event with which actual airlines would prefer not to be associated.
 "Octan" is used by The Lego Group as a fictional oil company. Before 1992, they used real life oil companies Shell Oil, Exxon and Esso.

Computing 

Placeholder names are commonly used in computing:
 Foo, Bar, Baz, and Qux (and combinations thereof) are commonly used as placeholders for file, function and variable names. Foo and bar are derived from foobar.
 Hacker slang includes a number of placeholders, such as frob which may stand for any small piece of equipment. To frob, likewise, means to do something to something. In practice it means to adjust (a device) in an aimless way.
 Alice and Bob, alternatives for 'Person A'/'Person B' when describing processes in telecommunications; in cryptography Eve (the eavesdropper) is also added.
 J. Random X (e.g. J. Random Hacker, J. Random User) is a term used in computer jargon for a randomly selected member of a set, such as the set of all users. Sometimes used as J. Random Loser for any not-very-computer-literate user.
 Johnny/Jane Appleseed, commonly used as a placeholder name by Apple.

Domain names
Certain domain names in the format example.tld (such as example.com, example.net, and example.org) are officially reserved as placeholders for the purpose of presentation.

Geographical locations 
Placeholders such as Main Street, Your County, and Anytown are often used in sample mailing addresses. Ruritania is commonly used as a placeholder country. Acacia Avenue has been used as shorthand for an average suburban residential street in Britain.

Something-stan, where something is often profanity, is commonly used as a placeholder for a Middle Eastern or South Asian country or for a politically disliked portion of one's own country. Example – Carjackastan for a place with high rates of automobile theft.

Timbuktu, which is also a real city in the country of Mali, is often used to mean a place that is far away, in the middle of nowhere, or exotic.

Podunk is used in American English for a hypothetical small town regarded as typically dull or insignificant, a place in the U.S. that is unlikely to have been heard of. Another example is East Cupcake to refer to a generic small town in the Midwestern United States.

Similarly, the boondocks or the boonies are used in American English to refer to very rural areas without many inhabitants.

In New Zealand English, Woop Woops (or, alternatively, Wop-wops) is a (generally humorous) name for an out-of-the-way location, usually rural and sparsely populated. The similar Australian English Woop Woop, (or, less frequently, Woop Woops) can refer to any remote location, or outback town or district. Another New Zealand English term with a similar use is Waikikamukau ("Why kick a moo-cow"), a generic name for a small rural town.

In British English, Bongo Bongo Land (or Bongo-bongo Land) is a pejorative term used to refer to Third World countries, particularly in Africa, or to a fictional such country.

Legal 
 In ancient Roman law, the names Aulus Agerius and Numerius Negidius were used to represent the plaintiff and the defendant. The names were both wordplays, respectively meaning "[I] set in motion" and "[I] refuse to pay". The model instruction to judges for civil suits began with si paret Numerium Negidium Aulo Agerio sestertium decem milia dare oportere, meaning "if [it] appears that Numerius Negidius ought to pay Aulus Agerius ten thousand sesterces...".
In the United States and Canada, John Doe and the variations Jane Doe (for females) and John Roe or Richard Roe (for a second party): used in legal action and cases when the true identity of a person is unknown or must be withheld for legal reasons. Jane Roe was used for the then-unidentified plaintiff (Norma Leah McCorvey) in one of the most famous legal cases in United States history, Roe v. Wade. These parties also appear in the legal fictions of the action in ejectment, which was the usual proceeding to quiet title to real property under common law pleading.
 Mopery: used in informal legal discussions as a placeholder for some infraction, when the exact nature of the infraction is not important.
 Blackacre and its neighbors Whiteacre, Greenacre, Brownacre, Greyacre, Pinkacre, etc. are used as placeholders for parcels of real property, usually on Law School examinations and the several State Bar Exams. They are sometimes located in Acre County in the fictional State of Franklin.
 Fnu Lnu is used by authorities to identify unknown suspects, the name being an acronym for First Name Unknown, Last Name Unknown. If a person's first name is known but not the last, they may be called "John Lnu" or "Fnu Doe", and an unidentified person may be "Fnu Lnu". For example, a former interpreter for the United States military was charged as "FNU LNU", and a mute man whose identity could not be determined was arrested and charged with burglary in Harris County, Texas under the name "FNU-LNU" (charges were later dropped because authorities could not communicate with the man). Fnu-Lnu conjunctions may also be used if the person has only a single name, as in Indonesian names. The name has been considered a source of humor when "Fnu Lnu" has been mistaken for the actual name of a person.

Medicine 
 St. Elsewhere is often used as a placeholder name for any regional hospital or other care facility from which an admitted patient was referred. The medical slang is honored in the name of the 1980s television show of the same name.
 GOMER (get out of my emergency room) is a name in medical slang for any patient who continually uses emergency room services for non-emergency conditions; its use is informal and pejorative.
 Element names from the periodic table are used in some hospitals as a placeholder for patient names, ex. Francium Male.

Military 
Often used in example names and addresses to indicate to the serviceman where to put his own details.
 Tommy Atkins, the generic name for a soldier of the British Army. Also, colloquially, Bill Oddie, rhyming slang on the nickname 'squaddie'.
 In the US Army and Air Force, Private (or Airman) Tentpeg and Snuffy are commonly used in examples (to explain various procedures) or cautionary tales. In the Marine Corps, Lance Corporal Schmuckatelli serves the same purpose.
 In the US Coast Guard, a generic Coast Guardsman is referred to as Joe Coastie (or Jane).
 In the Coast Guard, Navy, and Marines, a hypothetical member who has his act together is A.J. Squared-Away.
 In the Canadian Armed Forces, the generic name for a soldier is Private/Corporal/rank Bloggins
 In the British Army, the fictional Loamshire Regiment is used as a placeholder to provide examples for its procedures such as addressing mail or specimen charges for violations of military law.

Numbers 

 Umpteen is any annoyingly large number, as in the phrase "for the umpteenth time".
 Placeholder telephone numbers are often allocated from ranges such as 555 (where +1-areacode-555-1212 is reserved in North America for directory assistance applications) to avoid generating misdialled calls to working numbers. In the United Kingdom, Ofcom has set aside a range of numbers in larger geographic area codes, as well as fictional area code 01632 (0632 having been the code for Newcastle upon Tyne until replaced by 091 in the 1980s), for dramatic use.
 Common placeholders for postcodes in Canada include A1A 1A1 (a real postal code for Lower Battery Road, St. John's, Newfoundland) and K1A 0B2 (Canada Post Place in Ottawa). H0H 0H0 is reserved by Canada Post for fictional use (specifically for the mythical Santa's workshop). In the United States, the ZIP Code 90210 (from TV series Beverly Hills 90210) is frequently used. Numeric codes with repeated or sequential digits like 12345 (a General Electric plant in Schenectady, New York), or 99999-9999 (unused but in a prefix range for the vicinity of Ketchikan, Alaska) may also appear. 00000, which lies in an unused prefix range, can be used without confusion.
 In computing, some magic numbers (and other uses of hexadecimal numbers) apply hexspeak to create memorable hexadecimal values.

People 

 Joe Bloggs
 John/Jane Doe
 Joe Schmoe
 Tom, Dick and Harry
 Jane Smith
 So-and-so
 What's-their-name or what's-their-face, for a person whose name is momentarily forgotten 
 Examples (declension): what's-their-name, whatstheirname, what's-their-face, whatstheirface, what's-his-face, whatshisface, what's-his-name, whatshisname, what's-her-face, whatsherface, what's-her-name, whatshername

Science
In chemistry, tentatively discovered or hypothetical elements were assigned provisional names until their existence confirmed.  They were created using the prefix eka- . For example, eka-manganese was the placeholder name for technetium, a neighbor of manganese in group 7. See Mendeleev's predicted elements for details.

Similarly, the name "unobtainium" is frequently used for a material of highly desired characteristics which does not exist or which would be prohibitively expensive to mine, procure or synthesize.

Spoken and written language 
 Lorem ipsum: Simulated text used to fill in for written content in a page layout design

See also 
 Expletive attributive
 Filler
 Generic you
 List of placeholder names by language
 Nonce word
 Sampo
 The Thing-Ummy Bob
 Variable and attribute (research)

References

 Espy, W., An Almanac of Words at Play (Clarkson Potter, 1979) 
 Flexner, S. B. and Wentworth, H., A Dictionary of American Slang; (Macmillan, 1960)  
 Watson, Ian, "Meet John Doe: stand-ins", section 3.7 in IanWatson.org, Cognitive Design, (Ph.D. dissertation, Rutgers University, 2005).